Duhm is a surname. Notable people with the surname include:

Andreas Duhm (1883–1975),  German–Swiss chess master
Bernhard Duhm (1847–1928), German Lutheran theologian
Dieter Duhm (born 1942), German sociologist, psychoanalyst, art historian and author
Dietrich Duhm (1880–1954), German–Swiss chess master
Hans Duhm (1878–1946), German–Swiss chess master

References